Cape Banks Lighthouse is a lighthouse in the Australian state of South Australia located in the state's south-east on an unnamed headland in the gazetted locality of Carpenter Rocks about  north-west of the locality's town centre.

The siting of a lighthouse near Cape Banks was discussed as early as 1880, in conjunction with the rebuilding of the Cape Northumberland Lighthouse because it was suggested as a suitable site for the “optical apparatus” from the above-mentioned lighthouse to be reused and because it was a location “where so many shipping casualties have occurred.”

In March 1882, construction of the new lighthouse at “the Carpenter Rocks, adjacent to Cape Banks” was announced.

On 27 July 1882, Goss & Lambert of Mount Gambier was contracted for an amount of “about £3,000“ to build the “lighthouse, a store, and two lightkeepers' cottages.”

The light was first used on 1 January 1883.  In May 1928, an automated light was commissioned resulting in the departure of the keeper and their family.  Offers for either the removal of the keepers’ cottages or for the lease of the cottages and associated land for periods of five or ten years were advertised in the press by the Commonwealth Department of Works and Railways in August 1928.  The cottages and the store were subsequently demolished.

The lighthouse has been listed as a state heritage place on the South Australian Heritage Register since 11 November 1999.  Its significance is reported as follows:The Cape Banks Lighthouse is important in the maritime history of South Australia and the establishment of navigation aids during the late 19th century.  It represents developments in lighthouse technology and design of the time.  The lantern house, re-used from the original Cape Northumberland Lighthouse, is of particular significance as one of only three Deville and Company lanterns remaining in Australia.  Like one of the other lanterns (at Cape Borda) the lantern house at Cape Banks is of a distinctive fourteen-sided design.(HSA Assessment Report 1999)

The lighthouse also appeared on the now-defunct Register of the National Estate.

The cadastral unit of land which includes the lighthouse was added to the Canunda National Park on 14 August 1997.

See also

List of lighthouses in Australia
List of state heritage places in the District Council of Grant

Notes and references

Notes

References

Attribution

External links
Cape Banks Lighthouse video on YouTube

Lighthouses in South Australia
Lighthouses completed in 1883
1883 establishments in Australia
Limestone Coast
South Australian Heritage Register
South Australian places listed on the defunct Register of the National Estate